Nicole Yeargin (born 11 August 1997) is a Scottish-American athlete representing Great Britain. She was a medalist at the 2022 World Athletics Championships, 2022 European Athletics Championships and the 2022 Commonwealth Games.

Early and personal life
Nicole Yeargin was born on 11 August 1997 and studied real estate development at the University of Southern California. Initially focused in high school on gymnastics, soccer and American football, she began running track her senior year of high school. In 2019, she recorded personal bests of 23.26 seconds in the 200 metres and 52.76 seconds for the 400 metres. With an upbringing in Maryland, U.S. but with a mother from Dunfermline, Scotland she was cleared to represent Scotland in May 2020. Yeargin stated that her favourite thing about Scotland were sausage rolls.

Career
In May 2021, Yeargin clocked a personal best in the 400 m of 51.39 seconds to put her into second place in the British rankings for the season, and made it a double in terms of Commonwealth Games qualifying times with a 23.18 seconds run in the 200 m, which took her to fifth on the Scottish all-time lists. In June, she achieved the Olympic qualifying standard in the women’s 400 m with a new personal best of 50.96 seconds to reach the NCAA final, which moved her up to third on the Scottish all-time 400 metres list behind Allison Curbishley (50.71) and Lee McConnell (50.82). She also secured a place in the British team for the delayed 2020 Tokyo Olympics at the British Olympic Trials. At the Games, Yeargin was disqualified in the heats of the individual women's 400 m, and placed in the finals fifth and sixth with the women's 4 x 400 m relay and mixed 4 x 400 m relay teams  respectively.

Yeargin reached the semi-finals of the 400 metres event at the 2022 World Athletics Championships in Eugene, Oregon. At the Munich European Championships a month later, she was part of British 4 x 400 quartet than ran the second fastest time ever by a British women's team of 3:21.74. Her own split time was 49.7 seconds.

Personal bests
 100 metres – 11.68 (+1.4 m/s, Muncie, IN 2019)
 200 metres – 23.09 (-0.3 m/s, Fontainebleau 2022)
 300 metres – 37.15 (Philadelphia, PA 2022)
 300 metres indoor – 36.89 (Iowa City, IA 2023) 
 400 metres – 50.96 (Eugene, OR 2021)
 400 metres indoor – 51.02 (Fayetteville, AR 2023) ( Scottish)

References

External links
 Ursuline Arrows bio
 Kent State Golden Flashes bio
 USC Trojans bio

1997 births
Living people
Scottish female sprinters
American female sprinters
American people of Scottish descent
Kent State Golden Flashes women's track and field athletes
USC Trojans women's track and field athletes
People from Bowie, Maryland
Athletes (track and field) at the 2020 Summer Olympics
Olympic female sprinters
Olympic athletes of Great Britain
World Athletics Championships medalists
Commonwealth Games bronze medallists for Scotland
Commonwealth Games medallists in athletics
Athletes (track and field) at the 2022 Commonwealth Games
Sportspeople from Maryland
European Athletics Championships medalists
Medallists at the 2022 Commonwealth Games